Manfred Gmeiner (born 2 October 1941) is a German former ice hockey player. He competed in the men's tournament at the 1968 Winter Olympics.

References

External links
 

1941 births
Living people
German ice hockey players
Ice hockey players at the 1968 Winter Olympics
Olympic ice hockey players of West Germany
Sportspeople from Füssen